Kristian or Christian Wilson may refer to:

 Kristian Wilson (cricketer) (born 1982), English cricketer
 A name that Marcus Brigstocke's Pac Man joke is often falsely attributed to
Kristian Wilson (athlete), competed in Athletics at the 2009 Jeux de la Francophonie 
Christian Wilson, competed in German Figure Skating Championships